Alfred Kropp: The Seal of Solomon is a young adult novel by Rick Yancey. A sequel to The Extraordinary Adventures of Alfred Kropp, it continues the story of Alfred Kropp, the beloved of the Archangel Michael, who is sent to retrieve the Great Seal of King Solomon who long ago used the seal to control and imprison the fallen angels of heaven in a sacred vessel that has held them safe for a millennium. Now both objects have been stolen. The agents of OIPEP, led by the mysterious Operative Nine, member of the OIPEP, have a plan to save the ancient artifacts, and the world. The book was released in May 2007 through Bloomsbury.

The book received a positive review in Publishers Weekly, which highlighted the "emotional core" of the novel.

References 

2007 American novels
American young adult novels
Bloomsbury Publishing books